Ben Strome (1886 - October 1909) was a British Thoroughbred racehorse. Although highly regarded in his early days, he was considered a disappointment on the racetrack. He was exported to the United States where he became the leading sire in 1903. His most famous offspring was Hall of Famer Roseben. 

Ben Strome was a bay horse with a "splendid back and quarters, standing apparently on legs of iron." He was sired by Bend Or and out of Strathfleet by The Scottish Chief. Ben Strome was trained by John Porter, one of the most celebrated horsemen of the Victorian era. 

Expectations for Ben Strome were high but he did not make his debut until late in the 1888 racing season as Porter did not believe in racing horses early. In his only start at age two, he was unplaced in the Middle Park Plate behind Donovan. At three, his best result was a second-place finish in the St James's Palace Stakes to Pioneer. Now considered one of the great disappointments of Porter's career, Ben Strome was entered in a selling race at Newmarket where he was bought for 100 guineas. He was subsequently exported to the United States.

Stud career
Ben Strome was the leading sire in North America of 1903, when his top money earner was two-year-old champion Highball. He finished third in 1904 with progeny earnings of $106,305. His best offspring was the gelding Roseben, who was a three-time champion sprinter and set world records at six and seven furlongs. Ben Strome was also the broodmare sire of champion Cudgel.

Ben Strome died on October 14, 1909 at the age of 23.

Pedigree

Ben Strome is inbred 4 x 4 to Touchstone on the dam's side of his pedigree.

References

1886 racehorse births
1909 racehorse deaths
Racehorses bred in the United Kingdom
Racehorses trained in the United Kingdom
United States Champion Thoroughbred Sires
Thoroughbred family 14